This is a list of newspapers in California actively being published daily and non-daily. There were over 1,300 newspapers published in California at the beginning of 2020.

Daily Newspapers
<onlyinclude>

Non-Daily Newspapers

Defunct Newspapers 
See List of Defunct California Newspapers

See also
List of African-American newspapers in California

References

Archival collections